Cychrus maoxianicus is a species of ground beetle in the subfamily of Carabinae. It was described by Deuve & Mourzine in 2000.

References

maoxianicus
Beetles described in 2000